Austris Janis Vitols (12 July 1940 – 8 April 2009) was awarded the Rome Prize in architecture in 1967.

As a child his parents, brother and sister fled Latvia during the Second Soviet occupation. They spent several years in Displaced persons camps in post-World War II Europe. The family immigrated to the US first to Iowa and then settled in Minneapolis.

He studied architecture under Ralph Rapson at the University of Minnesota and then earned a master's degree from the MIT School of Architecture and Planning under Eduardo Catalano and while the dean was Pietro Belluschi

His Master of Architecture thesis, entitled "A Laboratory Building forResearch and Development"https://dspace.mit.edu/bitstream/handle/1721.1/77349/24918418-MIT.pdf?sequence=2

He won the Rome Prize in 1967 and then relocated to the San Francisco Bay Area to work with Frank L. Hope & Associates. He settled in Mill Valley, California with his wife, daughter and son while commuting weekly to the Frank L. Hope office in San Diego, CA.

He died on 8 April 2009 from glioblastoma, with his daughter and son at his side.

See also
List of Fellows of the American Academy in Rome 1896 – 1970

References

https://books.google.com/books/about/Almanac_of_Architecture_Design_2001.html?id=ZYcsVaPNv8sC

1940 births
2009 deaths
Architects from California
Latvian emigrants to the United States